Cinctiporidae is a bryozoan family in the order Cyclostomatida.

References

External links
 Cinctiporidae on www.eol.org

Bryozoan families
Cyclostomatida